Oleksandr Bortiuk (born 23 February 1965) is a Ukrainian bobsledder. He competed at the 1992 Winter Olympics, representing the Unified Team, and at the 1994 Winter Olympics, representing Ukraine.

References

External links
 

1965 births
Living people
Ukrainian male bobsledders
Olympic bobsledders of the Unified Team
Olympic bobsledders of Ukraine
Bobsledders at the 1992 Winter Olympics
Bobsledders at the 1994 Winter Olympics
Sportspeople from Mykolaiv Oblast